Netball's Festival of Stars was a series of celebrity netball matches organised by Network Ten and the ANZ Championship. It featured two teams representing two Australian charities, Beyond Blue and the National Breast Cancer Foundation. Matches featured two halves of fifteen minutes and were played before an ANZ Championship regular season match.

2009
The inaugural Festival of Stars was hosted at Sydney Olympic Park Sports Centre on 21 June 2009, before the 2009 ANZ Championship Round 12 match between New South Wales Swifts and West Coast Fever. Team Beyond Blue and Team NBCF were captained by Network 10 commentators, Luke Darcy and Liz Ellis, respectively. Team Beyond Blue, coached by Julie Fitzgerald, won the game following a penalty shoot-out between the two captains. The match was viewed by a television audience of 345,164 viewers.

Match summary

Teams

2010
The second Festival of Stars was hosted at Hisense Arena on 6 June 2010, before the 2010 ANZ Championship Round 12 match between Melbourne Vixens and Adelaide Thunderbirds. Once again Team Beyond Blue and Team NBCF were captained by  Luke Darcy and Liz Ellis, respectively. The match featured two fifteen minute halves and was umpired by Natalie Medhurst and Wendy Fleming, a former Australia under-21 international. ANZ donated $1,000 for the first goal scored in each half and $100 for every other goal scored in the match. This raised $20,000 for the two charities.

Match summary

Teams

2011
The third Festival of Stars was hosted at Sydney Olympic Park Sports Centre on 20 March 2011, before the 2011 ANZ Championship Round 6 match between New South Wales Swifts and Queensland Firebirds. Team Beyond Blue and Team NBCF were captained by comedians, Charlie Pickering and Adam Spencer, respectively. This was the third time Spencer played for Team NBCF. The show was hosted by Kelli Underwood and Liz Ellis with Sue Gaudion as the courtside expert. The event raised $13,800 for the two charities. Kerri Pottharst's nine goal tally helped Team NBCF win the match for the first time. Other notable performers included Iron Men Shannon Eckstein, who scored seven goals for Team Beyond Blue, and Matt Poole, who was named Player of the Match.

Match summary

Teams

References

Netball competitions in Australia
2009 ANZ Championship season
2010 ANZ Championship season
2011 ANZ Championship season
Charity events in Australia
10 Sport
2009 establishments in Australia
Sports festivals in Australia